Bondi Road is a road in the Sydney suburb of Bondi, Australia. The road traverses east from Syd Einfeld Drive in Bondi Junction to Campbell Parade, Bondi Beach. It is 1.8 kilometres long and is located in the local government area of Waverley Council.

History

Trams to Bondi

Bondi Road was once serviced by electric trams. From 1902 to 1960, services to Bondi, Bondi Beach and North Bondi ran via Bondi Road or Bellevue Hill. Services from the CBD commenced at Circular Quay (via Bridge and Elizabeth Streets) or Railway Square (via Elizabeth and Liverpool Streets). From Oxford Street, the line travelled through to Bondi Junction, where it joined Bondi Road. On the descent to Bondi Beach, trams entered Campbell Parade via an under pass at a point where Bondi Road was too steep, first by turning right into Denham Street, then left into Fletcher Street and Rowland Avenue, where the under pass was once located (now developed into apartments at 331A Bondi Road). A feature of this line was the large three-track terminus cut into a hillside at North Bondi, which opened in 1946. The under pass and cutting have now been filled in; part of it is now public reserve and apartments. The tunnel entrance is still visible at the apartments.

Description and points of interest
 Federation cottages
In the first two hundred metres from Oxford Street, there are several examples of the Federation cottage. This was the Australian version of the Queen Anne architectural style, and was the most popular housing style in Australia between 1900 and 1910.

 Terraced homes
On the north side of the road there is a strip of terraced houses in the Victorian style, with characteristic wrought iron balconies. This contrasted with the woodwork that was preferred in the Federation era.

 Waverley Council Chambers
On the south side of Bondi Road are the Waverley Council Chambers, the headquarters of the Waverley Municipality. The present building incorporates the earlier building designed in the Federation Free Classical style. The first chambers—a smaller building in Gothic Revival style—were demolished.

 Waverley Park
Immediately behind the Council Chambers is Waverley Park, which includes a war memorial, play area, tennis courts and oval. The war memorial commemorates the men and women of the Waverley area who served in World War Two. It was dedicated on Anzac Sunday, 1956.

 Bondi Waverley School of Arts
This building is situated on the north side of the road and was built in 1914. Run by Waverley Council, it functions as a community centre and is also used by the Waverley Woollahra Arts School. It is an example of Victorian influence in architecture and has a state heritage listing.

 Shopping Strip
East of Bennett Street is a shopping strip that includes older shops and dwellings in a mixture of Federation and Victorian styles, plus conspicuous influence of the Arts and Crafts style. There is also a group of three Federation cottages.

 Post Office
On the corner of Bondi Road and Ocean Street is the post office, which dates back to circa 1907. The building was constructed in the Arts and Crafts style that was popular in the Federation period and has a state heritage listing.

 St Patrick's Catholic Church
Located on the corner of Bondi Road and Wellington Street, this church was built in 1929–30. The site was originally occupied by a cottage that was used by Sisters of St Joseph from 1896. Later, a new convent, church and school were built on adjoining land. The church is heritage-listed.
 Royal Hotel
The Royal Hotel is located on the corner of Bondi Road and Denham Street. It was built in 1901–02. In February 1907, the Bondi Surf Bathers' Life Saving Club was formed at a meeting in this hotel, making it the oldest surf life-saving club in the world.

See also

References

External links

Streets in Sydney
Bondi, New South Wales